Eric Glen Weyl (born May 6, 1985) is an economist and a researcher at Microsoft Research New England and author of the book Radical Markets: Uprooting Capitalism and Democracy for a Just Society with co-author Eric Posner.

Weyl is co-creator of quadratic voting, a collective decision-making procedure designed to allow fine-grained expression of how strongly voters feel about an issue, and quadratic funding, a method of democratically disbursing resources.

Early life and education 
Weyl was born in San Francisco, and grew up in Palo Alto, California. He is Jewish. Growing up, his family favored the Democratic Party. As a youth Weyl also embraced free market beliefs after being introduced to the works of Ayn Rand and Milton Friedman.

Weyl graduated Choate Rosemary Hall preparatory high school in 2003, where he won the Douglass North award for economics and the William Gardner and Mary Atwater Choate Award for outstanding male scholar. He went on to attend Princeton University, where four years later, he had completed all his coursework and exams for a Doctor of Philosophy in Economics, as well as being selected as class of 2007 valedictorian.

Career
After his PhD, Weyl spent three years as a Junior Fellow at the Harvard Society of Fellows and another three years as an assistant professor at the University of Chicago before joining Microsoft Research as an economist and researcher. He also teaches a course at Yale University, "Designing the Digital Economy," that blends economics and computer science in much the way that  digital economists blend them at tech companies.

Selected bibliography 

 Radical Markets: Uprooting Capitalism and Democracy for a Just Society (Princeton University Press, May 15, 2018), written with Eric Posner

Articles

 "A price theory of multi-sided platforms", American Economic Review (2010)
 "Pass-through as an economic tool: Principles of incidence under imperfect competition", Journal of Political Economy (2013, with M Fabinger)
 "A proposal to limit the anti-competitive power of institutional investors", Antitrust Law Journal (2017, with FM Scott Morton)
 "Should We Treat Data as Labor? Moving beyond 'Free'", American Economic Association / aeaweb.org (2018, with Imanol Arrieta-Ibarra, Leonard Goff, Diego Jiménez-Hernández, and Jaron Lanier)

Personal life 
Weyl married Alisha Caroline Holland in 2010. They met in 2003 during their first year at Princeton. , Holland worked at Princeton as an Associate Professor of Politics.

References

External links 
 Interview with Glen Weyl by FiveBooks, "about {Radical Markets}, how his thinking has evolved, and what's happened to their ideas in the real world since the book was published in May, 2018. Accessed 24 August 2020.

1985 births
Living people
Microsoft employees
Writers from San Francisco
Writers from Palo Alto, California
Economists from California
Choate Rosemary Hall alumni
Princeton University alumni
Voting theorists
Yale University faculty
American male non-fiction writers
American economics writers
21st-century American non-fiction writers
21st-century American male writers

21st-century American economists